The following is an overview of 1936 in film, including significant events, a list of films released and notable births and deaths.

Top-grossing films (U.S.)
The top ten 1936 released films by box office gross in North America are as follows:

Events
January 9 – Silent screen actor John Gilbert, perhaps best known for his appearances in films such as The Merry Widow and The Big Parade, dies suddenly of a heart attack at his Bel Air home, aged 38.
February 15 – first Republic serial, Darkest Africa, is released.
May 29 – Fritz Lang's first Hollywood film, Fury, starring Spencer Tracy and Bruce Cabot, is released.
September 14 – Film producer Irving Thalberg, often referred by many as the "Boy Wonder of Hollywood", dies from pneumonia at his home in Santa Monica, aged 37.

Academy Awards

 Best Picture: The Great Ziegfeld – Metro-Goldwyn-Mayer
 Best Director: Frank Capra – Mr. Deeds Goes to Town
 Best Actor: Paul Muni – The Story of Louis Pasteur
 Best Actress: Luise Rainer – The Great Ziegfeld
 Best Supporting Actor: Walter Brennan – Come and Get It
 Best Supporting Actress: Gale Sondergaard – Anthony Adverse

Top Ten Money Making Stars
Exhibitors selected the following as the Top Ten Money Making Stars of the Year in Quigley Publishing Company's annual poll.

Top Western stars
A poll of the top Western stars was also published for the first time.

1936 film releases
United States unless stated.

January–March
January 1936
16 January
Ceiling Zero
Strike Me Pink
17 January
Augustus the Strong (Germany/Poland)
20 January
The Invisible Ray
22 January
Collegiate
24 January
Anything Goes
28 January
Rose Marie
30 January
Next Time We Love
February 1936
5 February
Modern Times
6 February
The Petrified Forest
7 February
The Milky Way
14 February
The Bohemian Girl
It Had to Happen
15 February
The Lawless Nineties
19 February
Girl Friends (U.S.S.R.)
20 February
Follow the Fleet
Things to Come (GB)
22 February
The Story of Louis Pasteur
28 February
The Prisoner of Shark Island
Wife vs. Secretary
29 February
Mayerling (France)
The Walking Dead
March 1936
1 March
Sutter's Gold
2 March
Man of the Frontier
6 March
Little Lord Fauntleroy
Three Godfathers
9 March
Love Before Breakfast
13 March
The Trail of the Lonesome Pine
18 March
These Three
20 March
Silly Billies 
22 March
The Great Ziegfeld
28 March
Road Gang
30 March
Too Many Parents

April–June
April 1936
4 April
Till We Meet Again
10 April
A Message to Garcia
The Moon's Our Home
Small Town Girl
11 April
Desire
The Singing Kid
16 April
Mr. Deeds Goes to Town
20 April
By the Bluest of Seas (U.S.S.R.)
24 April
Captain January
30 April
Thirteen Hours by Air
May 1936
6 May
It's Love Again (GB)
8 May
The Case Against Mrs. Ames
11 May
Dracula's Daughter
17 May
Show Boat
19 May
Love in Exile (GB)
20 May
Broken Blossoms (GB)
26 May
Hearts in Bondage
28 May
Osaka Elegy (Japan)
29 May
Fury
June 1936
5 June
Private Number
6 June
Bullets or Ballots
14 June
The Last Outlaw 
15 June
Secret Agent (GB)
17 June
Poppy 
20 June
Hearts Divided
26 June
San Francisco

July–September
July 1936
10 July
The Devil-Doll
16 July
Green Pastures
22 July
Satan Met a Lady
24 July
Poor Little Rich Girl
28 July
The Amazing Quest of Ernest Bliss (GB)
29 July
Anthony Adverse
August 1936
10 August
Where There's a Will (GB)
20 August
Romeo and Juliet
26 August
East Meets West (UK)
27 August
Swing Time
28 August
The Gorgeous Hussy
Militiaman Bruggler (Germany)
The Texas Rangers
September 1936
1 September
Tudor Rose
2 September
The General Died at Dawn
4 September
The Last of the Mohicans
The Road to Glory
6 September
My Man Godfrey
9 September
Spy of Napoleon (GB)
10 September
Dusty Ermine (UK)
11 September
The Man Who Changed His Mind (GB)
15 September
The Children of Captain Grant
23 September
Dodsworth
25 September
Craig's Wife
Ramona
26 September
Cain and Mabel
30 September
Yiddle with his Fiddle (Poland/U.S.)

October–December
October 1936
1 October
Everything Is Thunder (UK)
6 October
Allá en el Rancho Grande (Mexico)
9 October
Libeled Lady
15 October
The Garden of Allah
Sisters of the Gion (Japan)
16 October
15 Maiden Lane
Daniel Boone
Dimples
Hopalong Cassidy Returns
20 October
The Charge of the Light Brigade
22 October
Crime Over London (GB)
27 October
César (France)
Rebellion
30 October
Our Relations
November 1936
1 November
Legion of Terror
6 November
Come and Get It
Rembrandt (GB)
Tarzan Escapes
A Woman Rebels
12 November
Theodora Goes Wild
13 November
Go West, Young Man
16 November
Intermezzo (Sweden)
Laburnum Grove (GB)
The Plainsman
20 November
Love on the Run
25 November
Lloyd's of London
Pennies from Heaven
26 November
Men Are Not Gods (GB)
27 November
Born to Dance
December 1936
1 December
The Bold Caballero
2 December
Sabotage (GB)
11 December
General Spanky
Les bas-fonds (France)
12 December
Camille
20 December
Empty Saddles
21 December
Forget Me Not (UK)
24 December
The Jungle Princess
25 December
After the Thin Man
Stowaway
26 December
Gold Diggers of 1937
31 December
Let's Go With Pancho Villa (Mexico)

Notable films released in 1936
United States unless stated.

0–9
15 Maiden Lane, directed by Allan Dwan, starring Claire Trevor and Cesar Romero

A
Accused, directed by Thornton Freeland, starring Douglas Fairbanks Jr. and Dolores del Río – (GB)
Achhoot Kanya (Untouchable Maiden), directed by Franz Osten, starring Ashok Kumar and Devika Rani – (India)
After the Thin Man, directed by W. S. Van Dyke, starring William Powell, Myrna Loy and James Stewart
Allá en el Rancho Grande (Out on the Great Ranch) (Mexico)
The Amazing Quest of Ernest Bliss, starring Cary Grant (GB)
Anthony Adverse, starring Fredric March and Olivia de Havilland
Anything Goes, starring Bing Crosby and Ethel Merman
Augustus the Strong (August der Starke), directed by Paul Wegener – (Germany/Poland)

B
Les bas-fonds, (Underworld), directed by Jean Renoir, starring Jean Gabin and Louis Jouvet (France)
Black Eyes directed by Abdolhossein Sepanta (Iran)
Blood on Wolf Mountain (Lang shan die xue ji) – (China)
The Bohemian Girl, starring Stan Laurel and Oliver Hardy
The Bold Caballero, starring Robert Livingston
Born to Dance, starring Eleanor Powell and James Stewart
Broken Blossoms, starring Emlyn Williams and Dolly Haas
Bullets or Ballots, starring Edward G. Robinson and Joan Blondell
By the Bluest of Seas (U samogo sinego morya), directed by Boris Barnet (U.S.S.R.)

C
Cain and Mabel, starring Marion Davies and Clark Gable
Camel Through the Eye of a Needle (Velbloud uchem jehly) (Czechoslovakia)
Camille, starring Greta Garbo and Robert Taylor
Captain January, starring Shirley Temple
The Case Against Mrs. Ames, starring Madeleine Carroll and George Brent
Ceiling Zero, directed by Howard Hawks, starring James Cagney and Pat O'Brien
César, directed by Marcel Pagnol (France)
The Charge of the Light Brigade, starring Errol Flynn and Olivia de Havilland
Charlie Chan at the Opera, starring Warner Oland and Boris Karloff
The Children of Captain Grant
Circus (Tsirk) (U.S.S.R.)
Collegiate, starring Frances Langford and Betty Grable
Come and Get It, starring Edward Arnold and Joel McCrea
Craig's Wife, starring Rosalind Russell
The Crime of Monsieur Lange (Le Crime de Monsieur Lange), directed by Jean Renoir (France)
Crime Over London, directed by Alfred Zeisler (GB)

D

Daniel Boone, starring George O'Brien
The Desert Island (Lang tao sha) (China)
Desire, starring Marlene Dietrich and Gary Cooper
Devdas (India)
The Devil-Doll, directed by Tod Browning, starring Lionel Barrymore and Maureen O'Sullivan
Dimples, starring Shirley Temple
Dodsworth, directed by William Wyler, starring Walter Huston, Ruth Chatterton, Mary Astor
Dracula's Daughter, starring Otto Kruger and Gloria Holden
Dusty Ermine, directed by Bernard Vorhaus (UK)

E
East Meets West, starring George Arliss (UK)
Empty Saddles, starring Buck Jones and Louise Brooks
Everything Is Thunder, starring Constance Bennett (UK)

F
Follow the Fleet, starring Fred Astaire and Ginger Rogers
Forget Me Not, directed by Zoltan Korda, starring Beniamino Gigli and Joan Gardner (UK)
The Four Musketeers (Italy)
Fury, starring Sylvia Sidney and Spencer Tracy

G
The Garden of Allah, starring Marlene Dietrich and Charles Boyer
The General Died at Dawn, starring Gary Cooper and Madeleine Carroll
General Spanky, starring Spanky McFarland 
Girl Friends (Podrugi) (U.S.S.R.)
Go West, Young Man, starring Mae West, adapted by her from Lawrence Riley's 1934 stage play Personal Appearance
Gold Diggers of 1937, directed by Lloyd Bacon and Busby Berkeley
The Gorgeous Hussy, starring Joan Crawford and Robert Taylor
The Great Ziegfeld, starring William Powell, Myrna Loy, Luise Rainer
Green Pastures, adapted from the 1923 stage play, starring Rex Ingram and Eddie Anderson

H
Hearts Divided, starring Marion Davies and Dick Powell
Hearts in Bondage, starring David Manners and Mae Clarke
Hopalong Cassidy Returns, starring William Boyd

I
I'll Give a Million (Darò un milione), starring Vittorio De Sica (Italy)
Intermezzo, starring Ingrid Bergman and Gösta Ekman (Sweden)
The Invisible Ray, starring Boris Karloff and Bela Lugosi
It Had to Happen, starring George Raft and Rosalind Russell
It's Love Again, starring Jessie Matthews and Robert Young (GB)

J
The Jungle Princess, starring Dorothy Lamour and Ray Milland

K
Der Kaiser von Kalifornien (The Emperor of California) – (Germany)
Klondike Annie, starring Mae West and Victor McLaglen

L
Laburnum Grove, starring Edmund Gwenn and Cedric Hardwicke (GB)
The Last of the Mohicans, starring Randolph Scott
The Last Outlaw, starring Harry Carey
The Lawless Nineties, starring John Wayne
Legion of Terror, starring Bruce Cabot
Let's Go With Pancho Villa (Vámonos con Pancho Villa) (Mexico)
Libeled Lady, starring Jean Harlow, William Powell, Myrna Loy, Spencer Tracy
Limelight, starring Anna Neagle (GB)
Little Lord Fauntleroy, starring Freddie Bartholomew, Dolores Costello Barrymore, C. Aubrey Smith
Lloyd's of London, starring Freddie Bartholomew, Madeleine Carroll, Tyrone Power
Love Before Breakfast, starring Carole Lombard and Preston Foster
Love in Exile, starring Helen Vinson and Clive Brook (GB)
Love on the Run. starring Joan Crawford and Clark Gable

M
The Man Who Changed His Mind, starring Boris Karloff (GB)
The Man Who Could Work Miracles, starring Roland Young and Ralph Richardson (GB)
Mayerling, directed by Anatole Litvak starring Charles Boyer and Danielle Darrieux (France)
Men Are Not Gods, starring Miriam Hopkins, Gertrude Lawrence, Rex Harrison (GB)
A Message to Garcia, directed by George Marshall, starring Barbara Stanwyck, John Boles and Wallace Beery
Militiaman Bruggler (Standschütze Bruggler) – (Germany)
The Milky Way, starring Harold Lloyd
Modern Times, written, directed by and starring Charles Chaplin, with Paulette Goddard
The Mongolian Boy (Монгол хүү), directed by Ilya Trauberg is released as the first Mongolian film
The Moon's Our Home, starring Henry Fonda and Margaret Sullavan
Mr. Deeds Goes to Town, directed by Frank Capra, starring Gary Cooper and Jean Arthur
My Man Godfrey, directed by Gregory La Cava, starring William Powell and Carole Lombard

N
Next Time We Love, starring Margaret Sullavan, James Stewart, Ray Milland
Night Mail, documentary (GB)

O
The Only Son (Hitori musuko), directed by Yasujirō Ozu (Japan)
Osaka Elegy (Naniwa erejii), directed by Kenji Mizoguchi (Japan)
Our Relations, starring Laurel and Hardy

P
Palm Springs, starring Frances Langford and David Niven
Paradise Road (Ulička v ráji) (Czechoslovakia)
Pennies from Heaven, starring Bing Crosby and Madge Evans
The Petrified Forest, starring Leslie Howard, Humphrey Bogart, Bette Davis
Poppy, starring W.C. Fields
The Plainsman, starring Gary Cooper and Jean Arthur
Poor Little Rich Girl, starring Shirley Temple, Alice Faye, Jack Haley
The Prisoner of Shark Island, directed by John Ford, starring Warner Baxter and Gloria Stuart
Private Number, starring Loretta Young and Robert Taylor

R
Red River Valley, starring Gene Autry
Redes, directed by Fred Zinnemann – (Mexico)
Ramona, starring Don Ameche and Loretta Young
Rebellion, starring Tom Keene and Rita Hayworth 
Reefer Madness, (aka Tell Your Children), a cult exploitation film
Rembrandt, directed by Alexander Korda, starring Charles Laughton – (GB)
Road Gang, starring Donald Woods
 Robin Hood, Jr. (1936), directed by Leslie Goodwins
The Road to Glory, directed by Howard Hawks, starring Lionel Barrymore and Fredric March
Romeo and Juliet, starring Norma Shearer, Leslie Howard, John Barrymore, Basil Rathbone
Rose Marie, starring Jeanette MacDonald and Nelson Eddy

S
Sabotage, directed by Alfred Hitchcock, starring Sylvia Sidney and Oskar Homolka – (GB)
San Francisco, starring Clark Gable, Jeanette MacDonald, Spencer Tracy
Satan Met a Lady, starring Warren William and Bette Davis
Secret Agent, directed by Alfred Hitchcock, starring John Gielgud and Madeleine Carroll (GB)
Show Boat, starring Irene Dunne, Allan Jones, Charles Winninger, Paul Robeson, Helen Morgan
The Singing Kid, starring Al Jolson
Silly Billies starring Wheeler & Woolsey
Sisters of the Gion (Gion no shimai), directed by Kenji Mizoguchi (Japan)
Small Town Girl, directed by William Wellman, starring Janet Gaynor, Robert Taylor, James Stewart
Sportszerelem (Hungary)
Spy of Napoleon, directed by Maurice Elvey, starring Richard Barthelmess and Dolly Haas (GB)
The Story of Louis Pasteur, starring Paul Muni
Stowaway, starring Shirley Temple, Robert Young, Alice Faye
Sutter's Gold, starring Edward ArnoldSweeney Todd: The Demon Barber of Fleet Street, starring Tod Slaughter (GB)Swing Time, starring Fred Astaire and Ginger Rogers

TTarzan Escapes, starring Johnny WeissmullerThe Texas Rangers, directed by King Vidor, starring Fred MacMurray and Jack OakieTheodora Goes Wild, starring Irene Dunne and Melvyn DouglasThese Three, starring Miriam Hopkins, Merle Oberon, Joel McCrea (adapted from Lillian Hellman play The Children's Hour)Things to Come, directed by William Cameron Menzies, starring Raymond Massey, Ralph Richardson, Cedric Hardwicke (GB)Thirteen Hours by Air, starring Fred MacMurray and Joan BennettThree Godfathers, starring Chester Morris, Lewis Stone, Walter BrennanTill We Meet Again, starring Herbert Marshall and Gertrude MichaelToo Many Parents, debut film for Frances FarmerThe Trail of the Lonesome Pine, starring Sylvia Sidney, Fred MacMurray, Henry FondaTudor Rose, starring Cedric Hardwicke, Nova Pilbeam, John Mills (GB)

WThe Walking Dead, directed by Michael Curtiz, starring Boris KarloffWhere There's a Will, starring Will Hay – (GB)Whom the Gods Love, directed by Basil Dean, starring Stephen Haggard, Victoria Hopper – (GB)Wife vs. Secretary, starring Clark Gable, Jean Harlow, Myrna LoyWindbag the Sailor, starring Will Hay (GB)A Woman Rebels, starring Katharine Hepburn and Herbert Marshall
YYiddle with his Fiddle, starring Molly Picon (Poland/U.S.)

SerialsAce Drummond, starring John (Dusty) KingThe Adventures of Frank MerriwellThe Black CoinThe Clutching HandCuster's Last StandDarkest Africa, starring Clyde BeattyFlash Gordon, starring Buster CrabbeThe Phantom RiderRobinson Crusoe of Clipper Island, starring Ray MalaShadow of ChinatownUndersea Kingdom, starring Ray CorriganThe Vigilantes Are ComingComedy film seriesHarold Lloyd (1913–1938)Charlie Chaplin (1914–1940)Lupino Lane (1915–1939)Buster Keaton (1917–1928)Laurel and Hardy (1927–1940)Our Gang (1922–1944)Harry Langdon (1924–1936)Wheeler & Woolsey (1929–1937)The Marx Brothers (1929–1946)The Three Stooges (1934–1959)

Animated short film seriesFelix the Cat (1919-1936)Krazy Kat (1925–1940)Oswald the Lucky Rabbit (1927–1938)Mickey Mouse (1928–1953)Silly Symphonies Elmer Elephant Three Little Wolves Toby Tortoise Returns Three Blind Mousketeers The Country Cousin Mother Pluto More KittensScreen Songs (1929–1938)Looney Tunes (1930–1969)Terrytoons (1930–1964)Merrie Melodies (1931–1969)Scrappy (1931–1941)Betty Boop (1932–1939)Popeye (1933–1957)ComiColor Cartoons (1933-1936)Happy Harmonies (1934–1938)Color Rhapsodies (1934–1949)Rainbow Parades (1935-1936)Meany, Miny, and Moe (1936–1937)

Births
January 9 – K Callan, American author and actress
January 18 – Tim Barlow, English actor (d. 2023)
January 22 – Nyree Dawn Porter, English actress (d. 2001)
January 27 – Troy Donahue, American actor (d. 2001)
January 28 – Alan Alda, American actor
February 3 - Jeanine Basinger, American film historian
February 4 - Gary Conway, American actor and screenwriter
February 11 – Burt Reynolds, American actor (d. 2018)
February 12
Joe Don Baker, American character actor
Paul Shenar, American actor (d. 1989)
February 14
Joan O'Brien, American actor, singer
Andrew Prine, American actor (d. 2022)
February 17 - Jim Brown, American actor and former football fullback
February 29 - Alex Rocco, American actor (d. 2015)
March 1 – Georgina Spelvin, born Shelley Graham, American pornographic film actress
March 5 – Dean Stockwell, American actor (d. 2021)
March 8 - Sue Ane Langdon, American actress
March 19 – Ursula Andress, Swiss actress
March 23 - Luisa Mattioli, Italian actress (d. 2021)
April 12 - Charles Napier (actor), American character actor (d. 2011)
April 19 - Andy Romano, American actor (d. 2022)
May 1 – Danièle Huillet, French director (d. 2006)
May 4 - Eleanor Coppola, American documentary filmmaker, artist, and writer
May 9
Albert Finney, English actor (d. 2019)
Glenda Jackson, English actress and politician
May 14 – Bobby Darin, American singer, songwriter, actor (d. 1973)
May 17 – Dennis Hopper, American actor and performance artist (d. 2010)
May 20 - Anthony Zerbe, American actor
May 23 - Charles Kimbrough, American actor (d. 2023)
May 27 - Louis Gossett Jr., American actor
May 30 - Keir Dullea, American actor
June 3 – Larry McMurtry, American novelist and screenwriter (d. 2021)
June 4 – Bruce Dern, American actor
June 8 - James Darren, American actor, director and singer
June 22 - Kris Kristofferson, American retired actor, musician and songwriter
June 24
Robert Downey Sr., American actor and director (d. 2021)
Paul L. Smith, American-Israeli actor and director (d. 2012)
July 1 - Ron Masak, American actor (d. 2022)
July 5 – Shirley Knight, American actress (d. 2020)
July 9 - Dick Richards, American director, producer and screenwriter
July 24
Ruth Buzzi, American actress, comedian and singer
Mark Goddard, American actor
July 25 - August Schellenberg, Canadian actor (d. 2013)
August 5 - John Saxon, American actor (d. 2020)
August 13 – Vyjayanthimala, Indian actress, politician, dancer and singer
August 15 - Pat Priest (actress), American actress
August 16 - Anita Gillette, American actress
August 18 – Robert Redford, American actor and director
August 20 – Philip Voss, British actor (d. 2020)
August 25 – Hugh Hudson, English director (d. 2023)
September 7 – Bruce Gray, Canadian actor (d. 2017)
September 11 - Charles Dierkop, American character actor
September 14 - Walter Koenig, American actor and screenwriter
September 19 - Anna Karen, British-South African actress (d. 2022)
September 20
Andrew Davies (writer), Welsh writer
Pepper Martin (actor), Canadian-American actor (d. 2022)
September 21 - Burr DeBenning, American character actor (d. 2003)
September 24 - Jim Henson, American puppeteer, animator, actor and screenwriter (d. 1990)
October 8 - Leonid Kuravlyov, Russian actor (d. 2022)
October 9 – Brian Blessed, English actor
October 16
Peter Bowles, English actor (d. 2022)
Irina Demick, French actress (d. 2004)
October 19 - Tony Lo Bianco, Italian-American actor
October 23 - Philip Kaufman, American director and screenwriter
October 24 – David Nelson, American actor, director and producer (d. 2011)
October 26 - Shelley Morrison, American actress (d. 2019)
October 28 - Joe Spinell, American character actor (d. 1989)
November 9 – Teddy Infuhr, American child actor (d. 2007)
November 19 - Dick Cavett, American television personality, comedian and former talk show host
November 25 - Matt Clark, American actor
November 27 – Joel Barcellos, Brazilian actor (d. 2018)
December 3 - Mary Alice, American actress (d. 2022)
December 5 - John Erwin, American voice actor
December 6 - David Ossman, American writer and comedian
December 8 – David Carradine, American actor and martial artist (d. 2009)
December 10 – Howard Smith, American journalist, director and producer (d. 2014)
December 13 - Cliff Emmich, American actor (d. 2022)
December 22 – Hector Elizondo, American actor
December 23
Frederic Forrest, American actor
James Stacy, American actor (d. 2016)
December 25 – Ismail Merchant, Indian film producer (d. 2005)
December 29 – Mary Tyler Moore, American actress (d. 2017)

Deaths
January 9
John Gilbert, American actor (b. 1897)
Frank Rice, American actor (b. 1892)
January 24 – Harry T. Morey, American actor (b. 1873)
February 20 – Max Schreck, German actor (b. 1879)
February 28 – Justus Hagman, Swedish actor  (b. 1859)
April 6 – Väinö Lehmus, Finnish actor (b. 1886) 
June 17 – Henry B. Walthall, American actor (b. 1878)
July 11 - James Murray, American actor (b. 1901)
September 14 – Irving Thalberg, American film producer (b. 1899)
October 17 – Suzanne Bianchetti, French actress (b. 1889)

Debuts
Lloyd Bridges – Freshman LoveJudy Garland – Pigskin ParadeGloria DeHaven – Modern TimesVan Heflin – A Woman RebelsTony Martin – Follow the FleetAnthony Quinn – The Milky WayMargaret Rutherford – Dusty Ermine''

Notes 

 
Film by year
Articles containing video clips